Coke Ovens is a 5,962-foot-elevation (1,817-meter) linear set of pillars located in Colorado National Monument, in Mesa County of western Colorado, United States. It is also one mile south of Kissing Couple, and both can be seen from viewpoints along Rim Rock Drive. It is so named because the rounded shape resembles beehive coke ovens that were used in the nineteenth century to convert bituminous coal into coke, which was then used for smelting iron.

Geology
This feature is the remnant of differentially eroded Wingate Sandstone, which consists of wind-borne, cross-bedded quartzose sandstones deposited as ancient sand dunes approximately 200 million years ago in the Late Triassic. The caprock at the top of one of the four pillars consists of fluvial sandstones of the resistant Kayenta Formation. The slope around the base of the Coke Ovens is Chinle Formation. The floor of the canyon is Precambrian basement rock consisting of gneiss, schist, and granites. Precipitation runoff from this geographical feature drains to the Colorado River, approximately four miles to the northeast.

Climate
According to the Köppen climate classification system, Coke Ovens is located in a semi-arid climate zone. Summers are hot and dry, while winters are cold with some snow. Temperatures reach  on 5.3 days,  on 57 days, and remain at or below freezing on 13 days annually. The months April through October offer the most favorable weather to visit.

Gallery

See also
 List of rock formations in the United States

References

External links
 Weather forecast: National Weather Service
 Coke Ovens photo: Flickr

Colorado Plateau
Landforms of Mesa County, Colorado
Colorado National Monument
Sandstone formations of the United States
Rock formations of Colorado